Donald Clark (19 January 1914 – 16 August 1994) was an Australian cricketer. He played three first-class matches for Tasmania between 1946 and 1947.

See also
 List of Tasmanian representative cricketers

References

External links
 

1914 births
1994 deaths
Australian cricketers
Cricketers from Hobart
Tasmania cricketers